Three vessels of the Royal Navy have been named HMS Slaney:
  was a 20-gun  launched in 1813. She was converted into a receiving ship in 1832 and was broken up at Bermuda in 1838.
  was an  launched in 1857. She was wrecked in a typhoon off Hong Kong in 1870.
  was a  launched in 1877. She was converted into a diving tender in 1906 before being broken up in 1923.

References

 

Royal Navy ship names